Deochanda is a village in Piro block of Bhojpur district, Bihar, India. It is located north of Piro. As of 2011, its population was 1,170, in 189 households.

References 

Villages in Bhojpur district, India